Forbidden may refer to:
 Ban (law)

Films
 Forbidden (1919 film), directed by Phillips Smalley and Lois Weber
 Forbidden (1932 film), directed by Frank Capra
 Forbidden (1949 film), directed by George King
 Forbidden (1953 film), directed by Rudolph Maté
 Forbidden (Proibito), a 1954 Italian film directed by Mario Monicelli
 Forbidden (1984 film), directed by Anthony Page
 The Forbidden (2018 film), 2018 Uganda film

Books
 Forbidden (Cooney novel), a 1994 novel by Caroline B. Cooney
 Forbidden, a 2010 novel by Tabitha Suzuma
 Forbidden (Dekker and Lee novel), a fantasy novel by Ted Dekker and Tosca Lee
 "The Forbidden" (short story), a story by Clive Barker

Other
 Forbidden (band), an American thrash metal band
 Forbidden (Black Sabbath album), 1995, or the title track
 Forbidden (Todrick Hall album), or the title track
 Forbidden Technologies plc, a UK company based in Wimbledon
 HTTP 403, an error message
 "ForBiddeN", nickname of model-stylist Christine Dolce
Forbidden Peak, in North Cascades mountains, Washington state